The 2014 Billboard Latin Music Awards, honors the most popular albums, songs, and performers in Latin music in 2013, as determined by the actual sales, radio airplay, streaming and social data that supplements Billboards weekly charts. The ceremony was broadcast live on Telemundo and mun2 on April 24, 2014, from the BankUnited Center at the University of Miami in Coral Gables, Florida. The hosts were Raúl González, Roselyn Sánchez, and Laura Flores.

Marc Anthony won 10 awards including Artist of the Year, Top Latin Albums Artist of the Year – Male, and Tropical Albums Artist of the Year – Solo. Prince Royce was also a multiple winner in categories such as Hot Latin Songs Artist of the Year – Male, Latin Pop Songs Artist of the Year – Solo, Tropical Songs Artist of the Year and Streaming Song of the Year for his "Darte un Beso". Special awards were also handed out. Franco De Vita was given the Billboard Hall of Fame Award, Andrea Bocelli received the Lifetime Achievement Award and Carlos Vives was honored with the Billboard "Spirit of Hope Award".

Winners and nominees
Winners are listed first and in boldface:

Artists

Artist of the Year
Marc Anthony
Prince Royce
Jenni Rivera
Romeo Santos

New Artist of the Year
Luis Coronel
Codigo FN
Leslie Grace
Roberto Junior y Su Bandeño

Tour of the Year
Luis Miguel
Marc Anthony
Emmanuel & Mijares
Alejandro Fernández

Social Artist of the Year
Shakira
Enrique Iglesias
Pitbull
Prince Royce

Crossover Artist of the Year
Bruno Mars
Christina Aguilera
Rihanna
Robin Thicke

Songs

Hot Latin Song of the Year
Marc Anthony – "Vivir Mi Vida"
Enrique Iglesias feat. Romeo Santos – "Loco"
Prince Royce – "Darte un Beso"
Romeo Santos – "Propuesta Indecente"

Hot Latin Song of the Year, Vocal Event
Enrique Iglesias feat. Romeo Santos – "Loco"
Alejandro Fernández & Christina Aguilera – "Hoy Tengo Ganas de Ti"
Thalía feat. Prince Royce – "Te Perdiste Mi Amor"
Carlos Vives feat. Michel Teló – "Como Le Gusta a Tu Cuerpo"

Hot Latin Songs Artist of the Year, Male
Prince Royce
Marc Anthony
Daddy Yankee
Romeo Santos

Hot Latin Songs Artist of the Year, Female
Thalía
Christina Aguilera
Leslie Grace
Jenni Rivera

Hot Latin Songs Artist of the Year, Duo or Group
La Arrolladora Banda El Limón De Rene Camacho
Banda el Recodo de Cruz Lizarraga
Banda Sinaloense MS de Sergio Lizarraga
Voz de Mando

Hot Latin Songs Label of the Year
Universal Music Latin Entertainment
Siente
Sony Music Latin
Top Stop Music

Hot Latin Songs Imprint of the Year
Sony Music Latin
Disa Records
Fonovisa Records
Universal Music Latino

Airplay Song of the Year
Marc Anthony – "Vivir Mi Vida"
Enrique Iglesias feat. Romeo Santos – "Loco"
La Arrolladora Banda El Limón de Rene Camacho – "El Ruido de Tus Zapatos"
Prince Royce – "Darte un Beso"

Airplay Label of the Year
Universal Music Latin Entertainment
Sony Music Latin
Top Stop Music
Venemusic

Airplay Imprint of the Year
Sony Music Latin
Disa Records
Fonovisa Records
Universal Music Latino

Digital Song of the Year
Marc Anthony – "Vivir Mi Vida"
Daddy Yankee – "Limbo"
Prince Royce – "Darte un Beso"
Romeo Santos – "Propuesta Indecente"

Streaming Song of the Year
Prince Royce – "Darte un Beso"
Marc Anthony – "Vivir Mi Vida"
Enrique Iglesias feat. Romeo Santos – "Loco"
Romeo Santos – "Propuesta Indecente"

Albums

Top Latin Album of the Year
Marc Anthony – 3.0
Alejandro Fernández – Confidencias
Jenni Rivera – La Misma Gran Señora
Jenni Rivera – Joyas Prestadas: Pop

Top Latin Albums Artist of the Year, Male
Marc Anthony
Alejandro Fernández
Gerardo Ortiz
Prince Royce

Top Latin Albums Artist of the Year, Female
Jenni Rivera
Natalie Cole
Rocío Dúrcal
Ednita Nazario

Top Latin Albums Artist of the Year, Duo or Group
La Arrolladora Banda El Limón de Rene Camacho
Calibre 50
Il Volo
Voz de Mando

Top Latin Albums Label of the Year
Universal Music Latin Entertainment
Sony Music Latin
Top Stop Music
Warner Music Latina

Top Latin Albums Imprint of the Year
Fonovisa Records
Disa Records
Sony Music Latin
Universal Music Latino

Latin Pop

Latin Pop Song of the Year
Marc Anthony – "Vivir Mi Vida"
Daddy Yankee – "Limbo"
Enrique Iglesias feat. Romeo Santos – "Loco"
Prince Royce – "Darte un Beso"

Latin Pop Songs Artist of the Year, Solo
Prince Royce
Marc Anthony
Daddy Yankee
Romeo Santos

Latin Pop Songs Artist of the Year, Duo or Group
Chino & Nacho
Alexis & Fido
Jesse & Joy
Wisin & Yandel

Latin Pop Airplay Label of the Year
Sony Music Latin
Top Stop Music
Universal Music Latin Entertainment
Warner Music Latina

Latin Pop Airplay Imprint of the Year
Sony Music Latin
Machete Music
Universal Music Latino
Warner Music Latina

Latin Pop Album of the Year
Alejandro Fernández – Confidencias
Andrea Bocelli – Pasión
Jenni Rivera – Joyas Prestadas: Pop
Carlos Vives – Corazón Profundo

Latin Pop Albums Artist of the Year, Solo
Alejandro Fernández
Ricardo Arjona
Andrea Bocelli
Jenni Rivera

Latin Pop Albums Artist of the Year, Duo or Group
Il Volo
Jesse & Joy
Los Bukis
Maná

Latin Pop Albums Label of the Year
Universal Music Latin Entertainment
Sony Music Latin
VG Records
Warner Music Latina

Latin Pop Albums Imprint of the Year
Universal Music Latino
Fonovisa Records
Sony Music Latin
Warner Music Latina

Tropical

Tropical Song of the Year
Marc Anthony – "Vivir Mi Vida"
Enrique Iglesias feat. Romeo Santos – "Loco"
Prince Royce – "Darte un Beso"
Romeo Santos – "Propuesta Indecente"

Tropical Songs Artist of the Year, Solo
Prince Royce
Marc Anthony
Romeo Santos
Tito El Bambino

Tropical Songs Artist of the Year, Duo or Group
Chino & Nacho
Alexis & Fido
Grupo Manía
N'Klabe

Tropical Songs Airplay Label of the Year
Sony Music Latin
Siente
Top Stop Music
Universal Music Latin Entertainment

Tropical Songs Airplay Imprint of the Year
Sony Music Latin
On Fire
Top Stop Music
Universal Music Latino

Tropical Album of the Year
Marc Anthony – 3.0
Prince Royce – #1's
Prince Royce – Soy el Mismo
Various Artists – Sergio George Presents: Salsa Giants

Tropical Albums Artist of the Year, Solo
Marc Anthony
Juan Luis Guerra
Prince Royce
Romeo Santos

Tropical Albums Artist of the Year, Duo or Group
El Gran Combo de Puerto Rico
El Seis del Solar
Grupo Manía
Grupo Niche

Tropical Albums Label of the Year
Sony Music Latin
Atlantic Group
Top Stop Music
Universal Music Latin Entertainment

Tropical Albums Imprint of the Year
Sony Music Latin
Capitol Latin
Top Stop Music
Universal Music Latino

Regional Mexican

Regional Mexican Song of the Year
La Arrolladora Banda El Limón De Rene Camacho – "El Ruido De Tus Zapatos"
Banda Carnaval – "Y Te Vas"
Voz de Mando – "Y Ahora Resulta"
Gerardo Ortiz – "Damaso"

Regional Mexican Songs Artist of the Year, Solo
Gerardo Ortiz
Luis Coronel
Roberto Tapia
Noel Torres

Regional Mexican Songs Artist of the Year, Duo or Group
La Arrolladora Banda El Limón De Rene Camacho
Banda Carnaval
Banda el Recodo De Cruz Lizarraga
Voz De Mando

Regional Mexican Airplay Label of the Year
Universal Music Latin Entertainment
Discos Sabinas
Sony Music Latin
Gerencia360

Regional Mexican Airplay Imprint of the Year
Disa Records
DEL
Discos Sabinas
Fonovisa Records

Regional Mexican Album of the Year
Jenni Rivera La Misma Gran Señora
Jenni Rivera 1969 - Siempre, En Vivo Desde Monterrey, Parte 1 
Jenni Rivera Joyas Prestadas: Banda
Various Artists Las Bandas Romanticas de America 2013

Regional Mexican Albums Artist of the Year, Solo
Jenni Rivera
Gerardo Ortiz
Joan Sebastian
Roberto Tapia

Regional Mexican Albums Artist of the Year, Duo or Group
La Arrolladora Banda El Limón De Rene Camacho
Calibre 50
Intocable
Voz de Mando

Regional Mexican Albums Label of the Year
Universal Music Latin Entertainment
Discos America
Freddie
Sony Music Latin

Regional Mexican Albums Imprint of the Year
Fonovisa Records
Bad Sin
DEL
Disa Records

Latin Rhythm

Latin Rhythm Song of the Year
Daddy Yankee – "Limbo"
Alexis & Fido – "Rompe La Cintura"
J Alvarez – "La Pregunta"
Don Omar – "Zumba"

Latin Rhythm Songs Artist of the Year, Solo
Don Omar
J Alvarez
Daddy Yankee
Yandel

Latin Rhythm Songs Artist of the Year, Duo or Group
Alexis & Fido
Ilegales
Plan B
Wisin & Yandel

Latin Rhythm Airplay Label of the Year
Universal Music Latin Entertainment
Pina Records
Sony Music Latin
Wild Dogz

Latin Rhythm Airplay Imprint of the Year
Machete Music
Capitol Latin
Pina Records
Sony Music Latin

Latin Rhythm Album of the Year
Wisin & Yandel – Lideres
Don Omar – Don Omar Presents MT02: New Generation
Yandel – De Lider a Leyenda
Various Artists – Pina Records Presenta: La Formula: The Company

Latin Rhythm Albums Artist of the Year, Solo
Daddy Yankee
Don Omar
Arcangel
Yandel

Latin Rhythm Albums Artist of the Year, Duo or Group
Wisin & Yandel
Dyland & Lenny
Jowell & Randy
Kinto Sol

Latin Rhythm Albums Label of the Year
Universal Music Latin Entertainment
Nelflow
Sony Music Latin
Urban Latin

Latin Rhythm Albums Imprint of the Year
Machete Music
Capitol Latin
Pina Records
Sony Music Latin

Writers, Producers, Publishers

Songwriter of the Year
Anthony "Romeo" Santos
Luciano Luna Diaz
Isidro Chávez Espinoza
Gerardo Ortiz

Publisher of the Year
EMI Blackwood Music Inc., BMI
Arpa Musical, LLC, BMI
LGA Music Publishing, BMI
Mayimba Music, Inc., ASCAP

Publishing Corporation of the Year
Sony/ATV Music Publishing
Arpa Music
Universal Music Group
Warner/Chappell Music

Producer of the Year
Anthony "Romeo" Santos
Fernando Camacho Tirado
Sergio George
Jesus Tirado Castañeda

Billboard Lifetime achievement award
Andrea Bocelli

Billboard Latin Music Hall of Fame
Franco De Vita

References

Sources

External links
 2014 Latin Billboard Music Awards on NBCUniversal's website

Billboard Latin Music Awards
Latin Billboard Music Awards
Latin Billboard Music Awards
Latin Billboard Music Awards
Latin Billboard Music Awards